Charles Gregory may refer to:

 Charles Gregory (cricketer, born 1847) (1847–1935), Australian cricketer
 Charles Gregory (cricketer, born 1878) (1878–1910), Australian cricketer 
 Charles Hutton Gregory (1817–1898), British civil engineer
 Charles Levinge Gregory (1870–1944), British Army and British Indian Army officer
 Charles Gregory (rugby), rugby league and rugby union player from New Zealand

See also